Qiantong may refer to the following locations in China:

 Qiantong, Hebei (千童镇), town in Yanshan County
 Qiantong, Zhejiang (前童镇), town in Ninghai County